Opeatostoma  is a genus of sea snails, marine gastropod mollusks in the family Fasciolariidae, the spindle snails, the tulip snails and their allies.

Species
Species within the genus Opeatostoma  include:
 Opeatostoma pseudodon (Burrow, 1815)

References

Fasciolariidae